The cryosphere (from the Greek  kryos, "cold", "frost" or "ice" and  sphaira, "globe, ball") is an all-encompassing term for those portions of Earth's surface where water is in solid form, including sea ice, lake ice, river ice, snow cover, glaciers, ice caps, ice sheets, and frozen ground (which includes permafrost). Thus, there is a wide overlap with the hydrosphere. The cryosphere is an integral part of the global climate system with important linkages and feedbacks generated through its influence on surface energy and moisture fluxes, clouds, precipitation, hydrology, atmospheric and oceanic circulation. Through these feedback processes, the cryosphere plays a significant role in the global climate and in climate model response to global changes. Approximately 10% of the Earth's surface is covered by ice, but this is rapidly decreasing. The term deglaciation describes the retreat of cryospheric features. Cryology is the study of cryospheres.

Structure 

Frozen water is found on the Earth’s surface primarily as snow cover, freshwater ice in lakes and rivers, sea ice, glaciers, ice sheets, and frozen ground and permafrost (permanently frozen ground). The residence time of water in each of these cryospheric sub-systems varies widely. Snow cover and freshwater ice are essentially seasonal, and most sea ice, except for ice in the central Arctic, lasts only a few years if it is not seasonal. A given water particle in glaciers, ice sheets, or ground ice, however, may remain frozen for 10–100,000 years or longer, and deep ice in parts of East Antarctica may have an age approaching 1 million years.

Most of the world's ice volume is in Antarctica, principally in the East Antarctic Ice Sheet. In terms of areal extent, however, Northern Hemisphere winter snow and ice extent comprise the largest area, amounting to an average 23% of hemispheric surface area in January. The large areal extent and the important climatic roles of snow and ice, related to their unique physical properties, indicate that the ability to observe and model snow and ice-cover extent, thickness, and physical properties (radiative and thermal properties) is of particular significance for climate research.

There are several fundamental physical properties of snow and ice that modulate energy exchanges between the surface and the atmosphere. The most important properties are the surface reflectance (albedo), the ability to transfer heat (thermal diffusivity), and the ability to change state (latent heat). These physical properties, together with surface roughness, emissivity, and dielectric characteristics, have important implications for observing snow and ice from space. For example, surface roughness is often the dominant factor determining the strength of radar backscatter. Physical properties such as crystal structure, density, length, and liquid water content are important factors affecting the transfers of heat and water and the scattering of microwave energy.

The surface reflectance of incoming solar radiation is important for the surface energy balance (SEB). It is the ratio of reflected to incident solar radiation, commonly referred to as albedo. Climatologists are primarily interested in albedo integrated over the shortwave portion of the electromagnetic spectrum (~300 to 3500 nm), which coincides with the main solar energy input. Typically, albedo values for non-melting snow-covered surfaces are high (~80–90%) except in the case of forests. The higher albedos for snow and ice cause rapid shifts in surface reflectivity in autumn and spring in high latitudes, but the overall climatic significance of this increase is spatially and temporally modulated by cloud cover. (Planetary albedo is determined principally by cloud cover, and by the small amount of total solar radiation received in high latitudes during winter months.) Summer and autumn are times of high-average cloudiness over the Arctic Ocean so the albedo feedback associated with the large seasonal changes in sea-ice extent is greatly reduced. Groisman et al. observed that snow cover exhibited the greatest influence on Earth's radiative balance in the spring (April to May) period when incoming solar radiation was greatest over snow-covered areas.

The thermal properties of cryospheric elements also have important climatic consequences. Snow and ice have much lower thermal diffusivities than air. Thermal diffusivity is a measure of the speed at which temperature waves can penetrate a substance. Snow and ice are many orders of magnitude less efficient at diffusing heat than air. Snow cover insulates the ground surface, and sea ice insulates the underlying ocean, decoupling the surface-atmosphere interface with respect to both heat and moisture fluxes. The flux of moisture from a water surface is eliminated by even a thin skin of ice, whereas the flux of heat through thin ice continues to be substantial until it attains a thickness in excess of 30 to 40 cm. However, even a small amount of snow on top of the ice will dramatically reduce the heat flux and slow down the rate of ice growth. The insulating effect of snow also has major implications for the hydrological cycle. In non-permafrost regions, the insulating effect of snow is such that only near-surface ground freezes and deep-water drainage is uninterrupted.

While snow and ice act to insulate the surface from large energy losses in winter, they also act to retard warming in the spring and summer because of the large amount of energy required to melt ice (the latent heat of fusion, 3.34 x 105 J/kg at 0 °C). However, the strong static stability of the atmosphere over areas of extensive snow or ice tends to confine the immediate cooling effect to a relatively shallow layer, so that associated atmospheric anomalies are usually short-lived and local to regional in scale. In some areas of the world such as Eurasia, however, the cooling associated with a heavy snowpack and moist spring soils is known to play a role in modulating the summer monsoon circulation. Gutzler and Preston (1997) recently presented evidence for a similar snow-summer circulation feedback over the southwestern United States.

The role of snow cover in modulating the monsoon is just one example of a short-term cryosphere-climate feedback involving the land surface and the atmosphere. From Figure 1 it can be seen that there are numerous cryosphere-climate feedbacks in the global climate system. These operate over a wide range of spatial and temporal scales from local seasonal cooling of air temperatures to hemispheric-scale variations in ice sheets over time scales of thousands of years. The feedback mechanisms involved are often complex and incompletely understood. For example, Curry et al. (1995) showed that the so-called "simple" sea ice-albedo feedback involved complex interactions with lead fraction, melt ponds, ice thickness, snow cover, and sea-ice extent.

Snow 
Because of its close relationship with hemispheric air temperature, snow cover is an important indicator of climate change. Most of the Earth's snow-covered area is located in the Northern Hemisphere, and varies seasonally from 46.5 million km2 in January to 3.8 million km2 in August. North American winter snow cover increased during the 20th century, largely in response to an increase in precipitation. However, the IPCC Sixth Assessment Report found that Northern Hemisphere snow cover has been decreasing since 1978, along with snow depth.  Paleoclimate observations show that such changes are unprecedented over the last millennia in Western North America.

Snow cover is an extremely important storage component in the water balance, especially seasonal snowpacks in mountainous areas of the world. Though limited in extent, seasonal snowpacks in the Earth’s mountain ranges account for the major source of the runoff for stream flow and groundwater recharge over wide areas of the midlatitudes. For example, over 85% of the annual runoff from the Colorado River basin originates as snowmelt. Snowmelt runoff from the Earth's mountains fills the rivers and recharges the aquifers that over a billion people depend on for their water resources. Furthermore, over 40% of the world's protected areas are in mountains, attesting to their value both as unique ecosystems needing protection and as recreation areas for humans. Climate warming is expected to result in major changes to the partitioning of snow and rainfall, and to the timing of snowmelt, which will have important implications for water use and management. These changes also involve potentially important decadal and longer time-scale feedbacks to the climate system through temporal and spatial changes in soil moisture and runoff to the oceans.(Walsh 1995). Freshwater fluxes from the snow cover into the marine environment may be important, as the total flux is probably of the same magnitude as desalinated ridging and rubble areas of sea ice. In addition, there is an associated pulse of precipitated pollutants which accumulate over the Arctic winter in snowfall and are released into the ocean upon ablation of the sea ice .

Sea ice 
Sea ice covers much of the polar oceans and forms by freezing of sea water. Satellite data since the early 1970s reveal considerable seasonal, regional, and interannual variability in the sea ice covers of both hemispheres. Seasonally, sea-ice extent in the Southern Hemisphere varies by a factor of 5, from a minimum of 3–4 million km2 in February to a maximum of 17–20 million km2 in September. The seasonal variation is much less in the Northern Hemisphere where the confined nature and high latitudes of the Arctic Ocean result in a much larger perennial ice cover, and the surrounding land limits the equatorward extent of wintertime ice. Thus, the seasonal variability in Northern Hemisphere ice extent varies by only a factor of 2, from a minimum of 7–9 million km2 in September to a maximum of 14–16 million km2 in March.

The ice cover exhibits much greater regional-scale interannual variability than it does hemispherical. For instance, in the region of the Sea of Okhotsk and Japan, maximum ice extent decreased from 1.3 million km2 in 1983 to 0.85 million km2 in 1984, a decrease of 35%, before rebounding the following year to 1.2 million km2. The regional fluctuations in both hemispheres are such that for any several-year period of the satellite record some regions exhibit decreasing ice coverage while others exhibit increasing ice cover. The overall trend indicated in the passive microwave record from 1978 through mid-1995 shows that the extent of Arctic sea ice is decreasing 2.7% per decade. Subsequent work with the satellite passive-microwave data indicates that from late October 1978 through the end of 1996 the extent of Arctic sea ice decreased by 2.9% per decade while the extent of Antarctic sea ice increased by 1.3% per decade. The Intergovernmental Panel on Climate Change publication Climate change 2013: The Physical Science Basis stated that sea ice extent for the Northern Hemisphere showed a decrease of 3.8% ± 0.3% per decade from November 1978 to December 2012.

Lake ice and river ice 
Ice forms on rivers and lakes in response to seasonal cooling. The sizes of the ice bodies involved are too small to exert anything other than localized climatic effects. However, the freeze-up/break-up processes respond to large-scale and local weather factors, such that considerable interannual variability exists in the dates of appearance and disappearance of the ice. Long series of lake-ice observations can serve as a proxy climate record, and the monitoring of freeze-up and break-up trends may provide a convenient integrated and seasonally-specific index of climatic perturbations. Information on river-ice conditions is less useful as a climatic proxy because ice formation is strongly dependent on river-flow regime, which is affected by precipitation, snow melt, and watershed runoff as well as being subject to human interference that directly modifies channel flow, or that indirectly affects the runoff via land-use practices.

Lake freeze-up depends on the heat storage in the lake and therefore on its depth, the rate and temperature of any inflow, and water-air energy fluxes. Information on lake depth is often unavailable, although some indication of the depth of shallow lakes in the Arctic can be obtained from airborne radar imagery during late winter (Sellman et al. 1975) and spaceborne optical imagery during summer (Duguay and Lafleur 1997). The timing of breakup is modified by snow depth on the ice as well as by ice thickness and freshwater inflow.

Frozen ground and permafrost 
Frozen ground (permafrost and seasonally frozen ground) occupies approximately 54 million km2 of the exposed land areas of the Northern Hemisphere (Zhang et al., 2003) and therefore has the largest areal extent of any component of the cryosphere. Permafrost (perennially frozen ground) may occur where mean annual air temperatures (MAAT) are less than −1 or −2 °C and is generally continuous where MAAT are less than −7 °C. In addition, its extent and thickness are affected by ground moisture content, vegetation cover, winter snow depth, and aspect. The global extent of permafrost is still not completely known, but it underlies approximately 20% of Northern Hemisphere land areas. Thicknesses exceed 600 m along the Arctic coast of northeastern Siberia and Alaska, but, toward the margins, permafrost becomes thinner and horizontally discontinuous. The marginal zones will be more immediately subject to any melting caused by a warming trend. Most of the presently existing permafrost formed during previous colder conditions and is therefore relic. However, permafrost may form under present-day polar climates where glaciers retreat or land emergence exposes unfrozen ground. Washburn (1973) concluded that most continuous permafrost is in balance with the present climate at its upper surface, but changes at the base depend on the present climate and geothermal heat flow; in contrast, most discontinuous permafrost is probably unstable or "in such delicate equilibrium that the slightest climatic or surface change will have drastic disequilibrium effects".

Under warming conditions, the increasing depth of the summer active layer has significant impacts on the hydrologic and geomorphic regimes. Thawing and retreat of permafrost have been reported in the upper Mackenzie Valley and along the southern margin of its occurrence in Manitoba, but such observations are not readily quantified and generalized. Based on average latitudinal gradients of air temperature, an average northward displacement of the southern permafrost boundary by 50-to-150 km could be expected, under equilibrium conditions, for a 1 °C warming.

Only a fraction of the permafrost zone consists of actual ground ice. The remainder (dry permafrost) is simply soil or rock at subfreezing temperatures. The ice volume is generally greatest in the uppermost permafrost layers and mainly comprises pore and segregated ice in Earth material. Measurements of bore-hole temperatures in permafrost can be used as indicators of net changes in temperature regime. Gold and Lachenbruch (1973) infer a 2–4 °C warming over 75 to 100 years at Cape Thompson, Alaska, where the upper 25% of the 400-m thick permafrost is unstable with respect to an equilibrium profile of temperature with depth (for the present mean annual surface temperature of −5 °C). Maritime influences may have biased this estimate, however. At Prudhoe Bay similar data imply a 1.8 °C warming over the last 100 years (Lachenbruch et al. 1982). Further complications may be introduced by changes in snow-cover depths and the natural or artificial disturbance of the surface vegetation.

The potential rates of permafrost thawing have been established by Osterkamp (1984) to be two centuries or less for 25-meter-thick permafrost in the discontinuous zone of interior Alaska, assuming warming from −0.4 to 0 °C in 3–4 years, followed by a further 2.6 °C rise. Although the response of permafrost (depth) to temperature change is typically a very slow process (Osterkamp 1984; Koster 1993), there is ample evidence for the fact that the active layer thickness quickly responds to a temperature change (Kane et al. 1991). Whether, under a warming or cooling scenario, global climate change will have a significant effect on the duration of frost-free periods in both regions with seasonally  and perennially frozen ground.

Glaciers and ice sheets 

Ice sheets and glaciers are flowing ice masses that rest on solid land. They are controlled by snow accumulation, surface and basal melt, calving into surrounding oceans or lakes and internal dynamics. The latter results from gravity-driven creep flow ("glacial flow") within the ice body and sliding on the underlying land, which leads to thinning and horizontal spreading. Any imbalance of this dynamic equilibrium between mass gain, loss and transport due to flow results in either growing or shrinking ice bodies.

Ice sheets are the greatest potential source of global freshwater, holding approximately 77% of the global total. This corresponds to 80 m of world sea-level equivalent, with Antarctica accounting for 90% of this. Greenland accounts for most of the remaining 10%, with other ice bodies and glaciers accounting for less than 0.5%. Because of their size in relation to annual rates of snow accumulation and melt, the residence time of water in ice sheets can extend to 100,000 or 1 million years. Consequently, any climatic perturbations produce slow responses, occurring over glacial and interglacial periods. Valley glaciers respond rapidly to climatic fluctuations with typical response times of 10–50 years. However, the response of individual glaciers may be asynchronous to the same climatic forcing because of differences in glacier length, elevation, slope, and speed of motion. Oerlemans (1994) provided evidence of coherent global glacier retreat which could be explained by a linear warming trend of 0.66 °C per 100 years.

While glacier variations are likely to have minimal effects upon global climate, their recession may have contributed one-third to one-half of the observed 20th century rise in sea level (Meier 1984; IPCC 1996). Furthermore, it is extremely likely that such extensive glacier recession as is currently observed in the Western Cordillera of North America, where runoff from glacierized basins is used for irrigation and hydropower, involves significant hydrological and ecosystem impacts. Effective water-resource planning and impact mitigation in such areas depends upon developing a sophisticated knowledge of the status of glacier ice and the mechanisms that cause it to change. Furthermore, a clear understanding of the mechanisms at work is crucial to interpreting the global-change signals that are contained in the time series of glacier mass balance records.

Combined glacier mass balance estimates of the large ice sheets carry an uncertainty of about 20%. Studies based on estimated snowfall and mass output tend to indicate that the ice sheets are near balance or taking some water out of the oceans. Marine-based studies suggest sea level rise from the Antarctic or rapid ice-shelf basal melting. Some authors (Paterson 1993; Alley 1997) have suggested that the difference between the observed rate of sea-level rise (roughly 2 mm/y) and the explained rate of sea-level rise from melting of mountain glaciers, thermal expansion of the ocean, etc. (roughly 1 mm/y or less) is similar to the modeled imbalance in the Antarctic (roughly 1 mm/y of sea-level rise; Huybrechts 1990), suggesting a contribution of sea-level rise from the Antarctic.

Relationships between global climate and changes in ice extent are complex. The mass balance of land-based glaciers and ice sheets is determined by the accumulation of snow, mostly in winter, and warm-season ablation due primarily to net radiation and turbulent heat fluxes to melting ice and snow from warm-air advection(Munro 1990). However, most of Antarctica never experiences surface melting. Where ice masses terminate in the ocean, iceberg calving is the major contributor to mass loss. In this situation, the ice margin may extend out into deep water as a floating ice shelf, such as that in the Ross Sea. Despite the possibility that global warming could result in losses to the Greenland ice sheet being offset by gains to the Antarctic ice sheet, there is major concern about the possibility of a West Antarctic Ice Sheet collapse. The West Antarctic Ice Sheet is grounded on bedrock below sea level, and its collapse has the potential of raising the world sea level  over a few hundred years.

Most of the discharge of the West Antarctic Ice Sheet is via the five major ice streams (faster flowing ice) entering the Ross Ice Shelf, the Rutford Ice Stream entering Filchner–Ronne Ice Shelf of the Weddell Sea, and the Thwaites Glacier and Pine Island Glacier entering the Amundsen Ice Shelf. Opinions differ as to the present mass balance of these systems (Bentley 1983, 1985), principally because of the limited data. The West Antarctic Ice Sheet is stable so long as the Ross Ice Shelf and Filchner-Ronne Ice Shelf are constrained by drag along their lateral boundaries and pinned by local grounding of ice rises.

The Ice Ages 
In glacial times, the cryosphere considerably increased its size to cover a considerable part of the lands of northern Eurasia and America, lowering the sea level by more than a hundred meters and creating large ice shelves that connected the entire north of the planet. Also thanks to this (and continental drift), the first hominids, which arose in Africa, were able to reach all parts of the world, which would then separate with the return to normal seas and oceans.

Science
"Cryospheric sciences" is an umbrella term for the study of the cryosphere (not unlike atmospheric sciences, encompassing meteorology, climatology, and aeronomy). As an interdisciplinary Earth science, many disciplines contribute to it, most notably geology, hydrology, and meteorology and climatology; in this sense, it is comparable to glaciology.

See also
 Climate system
 Cryobiology
 Effects of climate change on the cryosphere
 Glaciology
 International Glaciological Society (IGS)
 International Association of Cryospheric Sciences (IACS)
 Polar regions of Earth
 Physical impacts of climate change
 Retreat of glaciers since 1850

References

Further reading
 Brown, R. D., and P. Cote, 1992: Inter annual variability in land fast ice thickness in the Canadian High Arctic, 1950–89. Arctic, 45, 273–284.
 Chahine, M. T., 1992: The hydrological cycle and its influence on climate. Nature, 359, 373–380.
 Flato, G. M., and R. D. Brown, 1996: Variability and climate sensitivity of landfast Arctic sea ice. J. Geophys. Res., 101(C10), 25,767–25,777.
 Groisman, P. Ya, T. R. Karl, and R. W. Knight, 1994b: Changes of snow cover, temperature and radiative heat balance over the Northern Hemisphere. J. Climate, 7, 1633–1656.
 Hughes, M. G., A. Frei, and D. A. Robinson, 1996: Historical analysis of North American snow cover extent: merging satellite and station-derived snow cover observations. Proc. 53rd Eastern Snow Conference, Williamsburg, Virginia, 21–31.
 Huybrechts, P., 1990: The Antarctic ice sheet during the last glacial inter glacial cycle: a three-dimensional experiment. Annals of Glaciology, 14, 115–119.
 IPCC, 1996: Climate Change 1995: The Science of Climate Change. Houghton, J. T., L. G. Meira Filho, B. A. Callander, N. Harris, A. Kattenberg, and K. Maskell (eds.), Contribution of WGI to the Second Assessment Report of the Intergovernmental Panel on Climate Change. Cambridge University Press, Cambridge, UK, 572 pp.
 Ledley, T. S., 1991: Snow on sea ice: competing effects in shaping climate. J. Geophys. Res., 96, 17,195–17,208.
 Ledley, T. S., 1993: Variations in snow on sea ice: a mechanism for producing climate variations. J. Geophys. Res., 98(D6), 10,401–10,410.
 Lynch-Stieglitz, M., 1994: The development and validation of a simple snow model for the GISS GCM. J. Climate, 7, 1842–1855.
 Martin, S., K. Steffen, J. Comiso, D. Cavalieri, M. R. Drinkwater, and B. Holt, 1992: Microwave remote sensing of polynyas. In: Carsey, F. D. (ed.), Microwave remote sensing of sea ice, Washington, DC, American Geophysical Union, 1992, 303–311.
 Meier, M. F., 1984: Contribution of small glaciers to global sea level rise. Science, 226, 1418–1421.
 Parkinson, C. L., J. C. Comiso, H. J. Zwally, D. J. Cavalieri, P. Gloersen, and W. J. Campbell, 1987: Arctic Sea Ice, 1973–1976: Satellite Passive-Microwave Observations, NASA SP-489, National Aeronautics and Space Administration, Washington, D.C., 296 pp.
 Paterson, W. S. B., 1993: World sea level and the present mass balance of the Antarctic ice sheet. In: W.R. Peltier (ed.), Ice in the Climate System, NATO ASI Series, I12, Springer-Verlag, Berlin, 131–140.
 Robinson, D. A., K. F. Dewey, and R. R. Heim, 1993: Global snow cover monitoring: an update. Bull. Amer. Meteorol. Soc., 74, 1689–1696.
 Steffen, K., and A. Ohmura, 1985: Heat exchange and surface conditions in North Water, northern Baffin Bay. Annals of Glaciology, 6, 178–181.
 Van den Broeke, M. R., 1996: The atmospheric boundary layer over ice sheets and glaciers. Utrecht, Universities Utrecht, 178 pp.
 Van den Broeke, M. R., and R. Bintanja, 1995: The interaction of katabatic wind and the formation of blue ice areas in East Antarctica. J. Glaciology, 41, 395–407.
 Welch, H. E., 1992: Energy flow through the marine ecosystem of the Lancaster Sound region, Arctic Canada. Arctic, 45, 343.
 Fedorov R. Cryogenic Resources: Ice, Snow, and Permafrost in Traditional Subsistence Systems in Russia. // Resources 2019, 8(1), 17, Cryogenic Resources: Ice, Snow, and Permafrost in Traditional Subsistence Systems in Russia
Arsuaga, J. L. "Un descubrimiento tan grande que nadie se ha dado cuenta" «Breve historia de la tierra con nosotros dentro» (in Spanish). Planeta editorial, S. A., 2, 2019, pages 13–17.

External links

Cryosphere overview map, from the UN Environment Programme
Canadian Cryospheric Information Network
Near-real-time overview of global ice concentration and snow extent
National Snow and Ice Data Center
ResearchChannel – Cryospheric Response to Climate Change.  A video produced by the University of Washington, March 2008